Xu Haiyan (born November 24 1984 in Zoucheng, Shandong) is a female Chinese freestyle wrestler who competed in the 2008 Summer Olympics.

Her personal best was coming 1st at the 2002 Asian Games - 63 kg freestyle.

External links
profile

1984 births
Living people
Chinese female sport wrestlers
Olympic wrestlers of China
People from Jining
Wrestlers at the 2008 Summer Olympics
Asian Games medalists in wrestling
Sportspeople from Shandong
Wrestlers at the 2002 Asian Games
Wrestlers at the 2006 Asian Games
Medalists at the 2002 Asian Games
Medalists at the 2006 Asian Games
Asian Games gold medalists for China
Asian Games bronze medalists for China
21st-century Chinese women